Thachanadan is an unclassified Southern Dravidian language spoken by a Scheduled tribe of India. Dissimilar to other Dravidian languages, its most likely affinities are to Mullu Kurumba, with which it has 66-72% lexical similarity.

References

Dravidian languages